Daniel Arnold (born 16 December 1978) is a retired German para table tennis player who competed in international level events. He is a six-time Paralympic champion, five-time World champion and eight-time European champion. He was born with deformed arms and a shortened right leg due to dysmelia.

References

1978 births
Living people
Sportspeople from Augsburg
Sportspeople from Munich
Paralympic table tennis players of Germany
Table tennis players at the 2000 Summer Paralympics
Table tennis players at the 2004 Summer Paralympics
Table tennis players at the 2008 Summer Paralympics
Medalists at the 2000 Summer Paralympics
Medalists at the 2004 Summer Paralympics
Medalists at the 2008 Summer Paralympics
German male table tennis players